Araras State Biological Reserve is a biological reserve in Rio de Janeiro, Brazil.

Location

The reserve is located in the mountainous Serra do Mar region in the Atlantic Forest biosphere and includes dense submontane tropical rain forest, montane and higher montane forest and alpine pastures.
It mostly lies within the municipality of Petrópolis, with a small part in the municipality of Miguel Pereira.
The area was originally set aside for fruit and wood production, but only 10% was exploited.
The remainder is in excellent condition and provides a safe haven for many species typical of the Atlantic Forest of Rio de Janeiro.

Administration

The  Araras State Biological Reserve was created on 7 July 1977 by the State Department of Agriculture and Supply.
The conservation unit is in the Central Rio de Janeiro Atlantic Forest Mosaic, created in 2006.
The objectives are to preserve the remnants of Atlantic Forest in the Serra do Mar corridor, maintain biological diversity and provide a refuge for endangered species of flora and fauna. 
The reserve may only be visited for educational purposes or for research, subject to prior approval.

Notes

Sources

1977 establishments in Brazil
Biological reserves of Brazil
Protected areas of Rio de Janeiro (state)
Protected areas of the Atlantic Forest